Abhi is a 2003 Indian Kannada language romantic comedy film written and directed by Dinesh Babu. It stars Puneeth Rajkumar and Ramya, making her debut,. Veteran Kannada actor Rajkumar sang a soundtrack for the film composed by Gurukiran. The film was remade in Telugu as Abhimanyu starring Kalyan Ram with Ramya reprising her role.

Plot
Abhi (Puneeth Rajkumar) is a cool guy who is good at cultural activities. Bhanu's (Ramya) family approaches Abhi's family in search of a rental house. In the beginning, there is hatred between them, but then they start to know each other. As Bhanu is a Muslim and Abhi is a Hindu, Bhanu's father does not agree for this and he eventually comes in search of Bhanu's lover to thrash him. Abhi does not agree with her father's behavior. In college they start to fight with each other. Bhanu comes to stop them and tells that he's her father. Bhanu's father vacates the house and they all leave for Hubli. Abhi with his friends goes in search of Bhanu in Hubli. Somehow Abhi manages to talk with bhanu as their family does not know that he was the lover. Abhi and Bhanu hug in front of their family, then they will come to know that those two were lovers. The old lady in Bhanu's house advises Abhi to leave the house immediately as the men from that house will be coming from mosque after the prayer. But Abhi asks why should he be scared of them, the old lady tells him that they will try to kill you. Abhi asks why and the old lady says that ask your mother. Abhi goes to Bangalore and ask his mother about that matter what that old lady told. Abhi's mother tells him a flashback story about his real parents and their assassination. She will also reveal that she was not his real mother. Bhanu also will hear the same story from her grandma. After some days Bhanu decides to give up her love for her family's sake and she leaves Hubli and goes to Bangalore to tell this to him. He also agrees with her. But Bhanu's father thinks that she ran away to marry Abhi and he tries to kill him. Then there will be fight between Abhi and Bhanu's father. The old lady advises Bhanu's father to stop his cruelty. He realizes his mistake and allows Bhanu to marry Abhi.

Cast

Production

The film is produced by Parvathamma Rajkumar for Poornima Enterprises banner.

Soundtrack

Release
The film ran for 150 days and collected 16 crores at the box office.

References

External links
 

2003 films
2000s Kannada-language films
Films set in Bangalore
Films scored by Gurukiran
Indian romantic drama films
Indian interfaith romance films
Films set in universities and colleges
Films about disability in India
Kannada films remade in other languages
2000s masala films
Films shot in Bangalore
Films directed by Dinesh Baboo
Romance films based on actual events
Indian films based on actual events